Line D was a proposed line of the Rome Metro system, whose project was shut down in 2012. The project in 2018 was reproposed for a reborn version of the Line.

Route

The line was supposed to run from south-eastern Rome, pass through the city centre and reach the northern part.

References

Proposed railway lines in Italy
Rome Metro lines